Bhai Dayala Ji died 9 November 1675, also known as Bhai Dayal Das  He was boiled alongside his Sikh companions Bhai Mati Das and Bhai Sati Das and the Ninth Guru, Guru Tegh Bahadur.

Early life
Dayal Das was born in a Brahmin family. Bhai Dayala was one of the twenty five or so Sikhs, alongside Mata Sulakhni (Mata Kishan), that accompanied Guru Har Krishan when he left Kiratpur to visit Emperor Aurangzeb in Delhi in 1604.

Service of Guru Tegh Bahadur 
Bhai Dayala was one of the Guru's most dearest and closest companions. Bhai Dayala was the chief of the sangat (holy congregation) at Patna Sahib and enlisted incharge of all the masands in the east, and when the Guru's son Gobind Rai (Gobind Singh) was born it was him who sent Guru Tegh Bahadur a letter, who was at Dacca, informing him of his son's birth.

Bhai Dayala helped take care of the Guru's son with the help of Bhai Kirpal and was with the Guru at Lakhnaur where the Guru was with his family and son Gobind Rai when they came from Patna and headed to Baba Bakala around 1672.

When the Guru left Anandpur Sahib on 11 July 1675 where he would head towards Delhi to meet Aurungzeb he was accompanied by Bhai Dayal Das, Bhai Mati Das, and Bhai Sati Das.

Arrest 

Bhai Dayala was one of the accomplice who accompanied Guru Tegh Bahadur when the latter left Anandpur for Delhi on 11 July 1675, the other two were brothers---Bhai Mati Das, a Dewan and Bhai Sati Das, a Scribe at Guru’s court. Along with the Ninth Guru, they were arrested on orders of Emperor  Aurangzeb at Agra.

Boiling 

On 11 November 1675 after Bhai Mati Das' execution Bhai Dayala refuted with temperament against the Mughals calling Aurangzeb a tyrant and cursed him for committing atrocities in the name of God and religion and said there would be a demise of the Mughal empire. Bhai Dayala was tied with an iron chain like a bundle then was made to stand erect into a big cauldron full of water with only his head and shoulders seen. The vessel was then heated to the boiling point as Bhai Dayala began to recite Japuji Sahib. He was then roasted into a block of charcoal.

See also
 Bhai Mati Das
 Bhai Sati Das
 Guru Tegh Bahadur

References

Sikh martyrs
Punjabi people
History of Punjab
People executed for refusing to convert to Islam
Executed Indian people
People executed by the Mughal Empire
17th-century executions in India
1675 deaths
Year of birth unknown
People executed by boiling